The Laurel is a luxury residential skyscraper in the Rittenhouse Square neighborhood of Philadelphia, Pennsylvania, costing $350 million to build and that will be  upon completion. Uses will include condominiums, luxury apartments, and retail. The residential tower is developed by Southern Land Company, a national real estate development company based in Nashville, Tennessee.

The Laurel will include 66 condominiums and 187 luxury apartments spanning 48 floors. The building will also feature 43,000 square feet of retail space that would wrap around Walnut, Sansom and 20th streets. The retail space will be on the building's first two floors. The building will include onsite and offsite parking with partnerships with nearby parking garages. Condominiums will start in the low $2 million and go as high as $25 million for the penthouses. The Laurel will include multiple amenity areas for all residents, condominium owners having access to the 26th-floor featuring a spa, meeting areas, and fitness amenities.

The Laurel, upon completion, will be Philadelphia's tallest residential skyscraper and the city's 10th-tallest overall skyscraper.

References

Proposed skyscrapers in the United States
Skyscrapers in Philadelphia
Buildings and structures under construction in the United States